William O'Brien (23 January 1881 – 31 October 1968) was a politician and trade unionist in Ireland. While rarely dominating the political spotlight, O'Brien was incredibly powerful and influential behind the scenes, maintaining a firm grip over Ireland's trade unions for many decades. Besides his leadership in the trade unions, O'Brien was a founder, alongside James Larkin and James Connolly, of the Labour Party of Ireland. In later years a rift formed between Larkin and O'Brien that would last the rest of their lives and often divide the labour movement in Ireland.

Early life
O'Brien was born in Ballygurteen, Clonakilty, County Cork on 23 January 1881, and was christened as 'John William'. He was the fourth child and third son of Daniel O'Brien of County Tipperary and Mary O'Brien (née Butler) of County Kilkenny. His father Daniel, an Irish nationalist, devout Catholic, and Irish-language revivalist had been a member of the Royal Irish Constabulary before retiring at the rank of Head Constable and moving the family to Dublin in 1886.

Upon moving to Dublin, O'Brien sought an occupation that could accommodate the fact he suffered from club foot and became a tailor.

Career

Constructing the Irish Labour movement
It was not long after becoming involved in the tailor profession that O'Brien, like two of his brothers, became a trade union member, and from there he became involved in the Irish Socialist Republican Party (ISRP). O'Brien is described as "a very significant figure in the ISRP" by the historian of the ISRP, David Lynch. He was a member of the Socialist Party of Ireland, serving on its executive.

In 1908, believing in the importance of organising unskilled labourers, he supported the leadership of James Larkin in the formation of the Irish Transport and General Workers' Union. Together, O'Brien, Larkin and Connolly established the Labour Party of Ireland in 1912, in their minds as the "political wing" of the Irish Trade Union Congress. The three men's leadership would also be instrumental in the Dublin Lock-out strike in 1913, quite possibly the most significant trade union action of its era.

Easter Rising

O'Brien was not a direct participant in the 1916 Easter Rising, although he was highly active around Dublin as event unfolded. Possibly because of his club-foot, Connolly told O'Brien "go home now and stay there; you can be of no use now but may be of great service later on". Despite this, O'Brien visited the GPO on the second day of the fighting to converse with Connolly about the ongoing situation. It was at O'Brien's home that Connolly sent his son Roddy to stay. O'Brien also encountered and spoke to his friend Francis Sheehy-Skeffington during the events of the Rising, one day before the murder of Sheehy-Skeffington by British forces. Towards the end of Easter week, both O'Brien and Roddy were arrested by British forces, with O'Brien held under suspicion of being a "Sinn Féin leader". They were held in Richmond Barracks in Inchicore with most of the other captured rebel leaders such as Thomas McDonagh, Eamonn Ceannt and Major John MacBride. Eventually, O'Brien was sent to a prison in Knutsford in England while the other detainees were executed. He was not able to return to Ireland until July 1916 when a general amnesty was created. In the aftermath of the Rising, O'Brien was one of the few prominent labour leaders still remaining, with Connolly now dead and Larkin having departed for the United States in 1914 after the lockout.

Irish revolutionary period
A member of the Irish Neutrality League, and Anti-Conscription Committee, during the World War I, O'Brien was interned on several occasions by the Dublin Castle government.  During one of these instances, he stood in the 1920 Stockport by-election, but was refused a release to campaign in it.

Upon the outbreak of the Irish War of Independence in 1920, ITGWU swole to its largest ever size and some considered the possibility that the Irish Revolution would take a similar path to the Russian Revolution of 1917, with O'Brien playing the role of "an Irish Lenin" but taking the revolution in a Syndicalist direction. O'Brien and the other leaders of the Labour Party came to believe that massive unionisation rather than electoral politics was where their focus should lay. They also did not wish to impede the Nationalists from establishing an Independent Ireland separate from the United Kingdom. Thus, O'Brien and the Labour Party did not contest the 1918 Irish general election. They did, however, work together to draft the Democratic Programme, a document which had been intended to guide how the newly formed Irish state would operate.

O'Brien and the Labour Party did not oppose the Anglo-Irish Treaty. During the ensuing Irish Civil War between pro and anti-treaty forces, the Labour movement campaigned for peace between both sides but could not halt the violence.

Post-revolutionary period
With the formation of the Irish Free State, O'Brien was elected as Teachta Dála (TD) for Dublin South at the 1922 general election. He lost his seat at the 1923 general election.

In 1923 Larkin returned from the United States and attempted to resume command of the entire Irish labour movement despite a decade's absence and not being present for the revolutionary period. In response, O'Brien sought to limit the powers of the ITWGU general secretary position. Larkin would not stand for this measure and generated a split by creating his own general worker's union, the Workers' Union of Ireland. This was the start of a long and terrible feud between O'Brien and Larkin that would ultimately see a decline in the influence of both unions, and Larkin generally kept out of the Labour Party.

O'Brien was elected for the Tipperary constituency in June 1927, losing his seat in September 1927. He was elected again for Tipperary at the 1937 general election, and lost his seat at the 1938 general election.

In 1930, O'Brien sought to have Leon Trotsky granted asylum in Ireland, but the head of the Free State government, W. T. Cosgrave, refused to allow it.

In 1944, there was an attempt made by Labour branches in Dublin to welcome Larkin back into the party. This resulted in accusations that the Labour Party was "being taken over by Communists". In response, O'Brien, James Everett and a number of followers broke away from Labour and formed the National Labour Party. The party would contest two general elections before reuniting with the Labour party in 1950.

Ideologically, O'Brien was a Reformist and Democratic Socialist, believing that Irish socialists should bring about socialism via the ballot box, not through violence or direct action. Despite his Easter Rising links, he consistently avoided endorsing militancy as a tool of the labour movement in Ireland. This viewpoint contrasted strongly to the beliefs of Larkin and was partially why the two could not agree to co-operate. Only once did O'Brien seriously consider militancy; during the dawn of the Irish Civil War and fearing the worst, O'Brien and other Labour leaders turned towards the Irish Citizen Army, proposing the concept of a "Workers' Army", of which the ICA would form the nucleus. However, this idea was rebuffed. O'Brien was once asked if was disappointed that the Irish electorate hadn't used their new parliamentary democracy to push for a stronger socialist presence, O'Brien reaffirmed his view by stating: {{Cquote|quote=It is not for me or anybody else to determine how the people should exercise their democratic and constitutional rights. The main thing is that they should have these rights. How they use them is for them to decide.

Despite their differences, in 1953 Larkin conceded that "William O'Brien was the only colleague of his who ever really worked".

Active in politics and the trade union movement into his 60s, O'Brien retired in 1946 and died on 31 October 1968. He was buried in Glasnevin cemetery, Dublin, on 3 November.

References

1881 births
1968 deaths
Burials at Glasnevin Cemetery
Irish socialists
Labour Party (Ireland) TDs
Members of the 3rd Dáil
Members of the 5th Dáil
Members of the 9th Dáil
Politicians from County Cork